Półwieś  is a village in the administrative district of Gmina Spytkowice, within Wadowice County, Lesser Poland Voivodeship, southern Poland. The village has a population of 525 (National Census 2011).

History
The Cistercian monastery held possession of the village until the end of the 18th century.

In the years 1975–1998, the village was located in the Bielsko province.

Until December 31, 2006, the village was part of the administrative district of Gmina Brzeźnica.

References

Villages in Wadowice County